Adolphus Henry Everand Barton (1846 – 20 May 1916) was a Pastoralist, and member of the Queensland Legislative Assembly.

Early days
Barton was born in London to parents William Henry Barton and his wife Sarah Hannah. After arriving in Australia he was educated at Melbourne Church of England Grammar School. After two years gaining pastoral experience in New Zealand
he became manager of his father's Armadilla Station in 1864. He then settled in Stanthorpe as a stock and station agent and later on became the licensee of Farley's Hotel in that town.

Political career
Having been a member of the Stanthorpe Divisional Board, Barton was elected the member for Carnarvon
in the Queensland Legislative Assembly in 1904. He held the seat until his defeat in 1907.

He was the chairman of the Stanthorpe Hospital Committee, Vice-President of the Board of Agricultural Association, and a Trustee of the Stanthorpe General Cemetery.

Personal life
In 1876, Barton married Emma Churchill (died 1946) and together had two sons and five daughters.

He died in 1916 and was buried in Stanthorpe General Cemetery.

References

Members of the Queensland Legislative Assembly
1846 births
1916 deaths
Australian stock and station agents
19th-century Australian businesspeople